Tillandsia ionochroma is a species of flowering plant in the genus Tillandsia. This species is native to Bolivia, Peru, Venezuela, and Ecuador.

References

ionochroma
Flora of South America
Plants described in 1896